The Caproni Ca.97 was a civil utility aircraft produced in Italy in the late 1920s and early 1930s. As originally designed, it was a high-wing braced trimotor monoplane of conventional configuration with one engine mounted on the nose and the other two carried on strut-mounted nacelles at the fuselage sides. Examples were also produced with only the nose engine or only the two nacelle-mounted engines.

Operational history
Some aircraft were used by airlines in small numbers. Military versions were used by the Regia Aeronautica in colonial policing roles, particularly in Libya from November 1929.

Variants
Ca.97 Prototype 3-engined powered by 3x  Lorraine-Dietrich 5P 5-cylinder radial engines; one built.
Ca.97 C.Tr. (C.Tr. - coloniale trasporto  - colonial transport), colonial transports similar to the Ca.97, powered by 3x  Walter Mars radial engines;two built.
Ca.97 C.Mo Powered by a single  Alfa Romeo Jupiter VIII Ri.
Ca.97 MPowered by a single  Alfa Romeo Jupiter IV.
Ca.97 CoColonial reconnaissance-bomber, powered by a single  Alfa Romeo Jupiter IV; five aircraft built.
Ca.97 RiArmed reconnaissance aircraft, powered by a single  Alfa Romeo Jupiter VIII Ri; four built for the Regia Aeronautica.
Ca.97 Idro Twin-float seaplane version, powered by a single  Alfa Romeo Jupiter VIII Ri; one aircraft built.

Operators

Civil

 Salvatore Castelli
 Società Aerea Mediterranea
 Ala Littoria

 Malért (Magyar Légiforgalmi R.T.)

Military

Regia Aeronautica

Magyar Légierő (Hungarian Air Force)

Specifications (Ca.97 Ri)

References

 
 
 

Ca.097
1920s Italian civil utility aircraft
1920s Italian bomber aircraft
Trimotors
Single-engined tractor aircraft
High-wing aircraft
Aircraft first flown in 1927